Josseling Yahoska Berríos Mendoza (born 3 December 1993) is a Nicaraguan footballer who plays as a forward for the Nicaragua women's national team.

International career
Berríos capped for Nicaragua at senior level during two Central American and Caribbean Games editions (2014 and 2018), the 2018 CONCACAF Women's Championship qualification and the 2020 CONCACAF Women's Olympic Qualifying Championship qualification.

References 

1993 births
Living people
Nicaraguan women's footballers
Women's association football forwards
Nicaragua women's international footballers